Rowe House is a historic home located at Wayland in Steuben County, New York.  It is a large three-by-seven-bay Tudor Revival– style residential building with an attached 1-story, three-bay garage wing at the rear.  It was designed in 1926 by noted Rochester architect J. Foster Warner.

It was listed on the National Register of Historic Places in 2008.

References

Houses on the National Register of Historic Places in New York (state)
Houses completed in 1926
Houses in Steuben County, New York
Tudor Revival architecture in New York (state)
National Register of Historic Places in Steuben County, New York